Johan Jentoft Johansen (20 April 1906 - 21 April 1973) was a Norwegian politician for the Liberal Party.

Johansen served as a deputy representative to the Norwegian Parliament from the Market towns of Nordland, Troms and Finnmark during the term 1937–1945 and from Telemark during the term 1958–1961.

References

1906 births
1973 deaths
Deputy members of the Storting
Liberal Party (Norway) politicians